is a railway station of Chūō Main Line, East Japan Railway Company (JR East) in Nagasaka, in the city of Hokuto, Yamanashi Prefecture, Japan.

Lines
Nagasaka Station is served by the Chūō Main Line, and is 166.3 kilometers from the terminus of the line at Tokyo Station.

Station layout
The station consists of two opposed ground level side platforms. The station is built on a hill, with the tracks reached via stairs underneath. The station is unattended.

Platforms

History
Nagasaka Station was opened on December 11, 1918 as a station on the Japanese Government Railways (JGR) Chūō Main Line. The JGR became the JNR (Japanese National Railways) after the end of World War II. Scheduled freight services were discontinued from February 1972. With the dissolution and privatization of the JNR on April 1, 1987, the station came under the control of the East Japan Railway Company.

Passenger statistics
In fiscal 2015, the station was used by an average of 1,131 passengers daily (boarding passengers only).

Surrounding area
Former Nagasaka Town Hall
Musée Kiyoharu Shirakaba

See also
 List of railway stations in Japan

References

 Miyoshi Kozo. Chuo-sen Machi to eki Hyaku-niju nen. JT Publishing (2009)

External links

 JR East Nagasaka Station 

Railway stations in Yamanashi Prefecture
Railway stations in Japan opened in 1918
Chūō Main Line
Stations of East Japan Railway Company
Hokuto, Yamanashi